Dillon Airport  is a county-owned airport five miles northeast of Dillon, in Beaverhead County, Montana.

Facilities
It has two asphalt runways: 17/35 is 6,500 by 75 feet (1,981 x 23 m) and 4/22 is 3,599 by 60 feet (1,097 x 18 m).

In the year ending September 5, 2008 the airport had 10,500 aircraft operations, average 28 per day: 90% general aviation, 8% air taxi and 2% military. 21 aircraft were then based at this airport, all single-engine.

References

External links 
 

Airports in Montana
Buildings and structures in Beaverhead County, Montana
Transportation in Beaverhead County, Montana